Long Shadow, The Long Shadow or Long Shadows may refer to:

Books
 The Long Shadow, a 1909 Western novel by B. M. Bower
 The Long Shadow (Gilbert novel), a 1932 novel by Anthony Gilbert
 The Long Shadow (Cleary novel), a 1949 thriller by Jon Cleary
 The Long Shadow, a 1973 Harlequin Romance novel by Jane Donnelly
 The Long Shadow, a 1983 historical novel by Cynthia Harrod-Eagles that is part of the series The Morland Dynasty
 The Long Shadow, a 2008 novel by Liza Marklund
 The Long Shadow, a 2012 novel by Mark Mills
 The Long Shadow: The Great War and the Twentieth Century, a 2013 book by David Reynolds
 Long Shadows (Hunter novel), a 2008 novel in the Warriors: Power of Three series by Erin Hunter
 Long Shadows (Baldacci novel), a 2022 novel by David Baldaaci
Long Shadows, a short story collection by Marie Luise Kaschnitz

Film and television
 The Long Shadow (1961 film), a British drama film
 Long Shadow (TV series), a 2014 BBC documentary series about World War I
 "The Long Shadow", a 1961 episode of the anthology series Dick Powell's Zane Grey Theatre starring Ronald and Nancy Reagan
 Long Shadow, a 1996 TV movie shown on the anthology series American Playhouse
 Long Shadow, a superhero in the 2004–06 animated TV series Justice League Unlimited based on the character Apache Chief
 The Long Shadow (2022 TV series), a British ITV drama series depicting the crimes of Peter Sutcliffe and the serial killer's detection

Play
 Rebus: Long Shadows, a 2018 play by Ian Rankin and Rona Munro

Music
 "Long Shadow", the name of several musical compositions by Haukur Tómasson
 "Long Shadow", a song by Joe Strummer & the Mescaleros from the 2003 album Streetcore
 "Long Shadow", a song by Jackson United from the 2004 album Western Ballads

See also
The Longshadows, musical collaboration between Gin Blossoms vocalist Robin Wilson and composer/producer Steve French